The .280 British was an experimental rimless bottlenecked intermediate rifle cartridge.  It was later designated 7 mm MK1Z, and has also been known as 7 mm NATO, .280/30, .280 Enfield, .280 NATO, 7 mm FN Short, and 7×43mm.

Like most armed forces in the immediate post-World War II era, the British Army began experimenting with lighter rounds after meeting the German StG 44 in combat. The Army began development in the late 1940s, with subsequent help from Fabrique Nationale in Belgium and the Canadian Army. The .280 British was tested in a variety of rifles and machine guns including the EM-2, Lee–Enfield, FN FAL, Bren, M1 Garand and Taden gun.

Despite its success as an intermediate cartridge, the .280 British was not considered powerful enough by the U.S. Army and several variants of the .280 British were created in an attempt to appease the U.S. Army. However, the U.S. Army continued to reject these variants, ultimately adopting the cartridge that was then designated the 7.62×51mm NATO.

History

Impetus
During World War II the standard British rifle and machine gun round was the venerable .303 British. Efforts to replace the .303 with a more modern round predated even World War I, but a series of events kept it in service in spite of its rimmed design causing a number of alleged problems.

During the war the Allies encountered the new 7.92 "Kurz" cartridge on the battlefield and noted its effectiveness. The Kurz was an "intermediate power" round, less than a conventional rifle round like the .303, but more than pistol rounds like the 9mm Parabellum. This gave the Kurz rifle-like performance in close-range encounters, while still having a small enough recoil that it could be fired in fully automatic fire. This led British small arms designers to begin the development of their own intermediate round.

The goal of the British designers was to create a cartridge that would replace all small arms in .303 calibre including the Bren, the No.4 Rifle and the Vickers medium machine gun with a cartridge suitable for a "light rifle". Thus the cartridge had to demonstrate ballistic performance equal to that of a full powered rifle round, yet exhibit as little recoil and blast as possible. This appeared possible through improved bullet shaping. A shorter cartridge producing lower recoil also enabled the weapon to be shorter and lighter, and hence easier to use.

Selection of the .280
After extensive tests by the "Ideal Cartridge Panel" in 1945, the British decided upon two 7 mm cartridges – the .270 and the .276. In order to focus their efforts, the British ceased research on the .270 and concentrated their efforts on the .276. The .276 was later renamed the .280 British even though no dimensions were changed.

Recoil of the .280 British cartridge was calculated to be a little under half of the .303. Long range performance actually surpassed that of the .303, and shooters reported that it was much more comfortable to fire with the reduced recoil and reduced blast. It seemed that the British designers had accomplished their goals, and proceeded to introduce the cartridge to their NATO allies.

Counterparts in Belgium and Canada proved very interested, and the Belgian company FN would introduce their own gun designs based on the .280 as well as produce the rounds in quantity. However, the Americans refused to adopt a calibre under .30 inch, or with ballistics inferior to the then-standard .30-06 Springfield round. The British then attempted to appease the Americans though a series of changes to the round. The first was a small change to the rim diameter of the .280 to the size of the .30-06 Springfield to produce the .280/30 cartridge, which was produced in large numbers and is the basis of the dimensions listed to the right.

When the .280/30 was rejected by the Americans as being too weak with too great a drop in trajectory beyond , the British and Belgians made larger changes to the cartridge design. These resulted in several different variations; one was just a .280/30 with the bullet seated less deeply so more powder could be put in the case, another was a T65 cartridge case necked down to 7 mm.

Unsatisfied with the U.S. Army's response on the issue, the British adopted the EM-2 and the .280/30 as their primary rifle and ammunition in 1951 with the .280/30 being re-designated as the "7 mm MK1Z".

Selection of 7.62 NATO
Britain, Canada and the United States, founding members of NATO, had all signed an agreement that member states would develop and deploy common small arms and cartridges, developed through competitive trials in co-operation together. Britain and Canada had been open about their developments, and the Americans claimed they were not developing a round of their own and were known to be trialing the British designs.

In fact, Colonel Rene Studler, head of the US Small Arms Bureau of Ordnance had been diametrically opposed to a bullpup design and the .280 cartridge, and had started two secret projects on a .30 calibre cartridge. These were the T25 rifle at Springfield Armory under the direction of Earle Harvey, firing the T65 cartridge being developed at Frankford Arsenal. Between 1947 and 1952 the British and Canadians made clear to the United States they were aware of their secret work, stating that it was against the open, collaborative nature of the agreement, making their disapproval clear.

Matters took a turn for the worse when Rene Studler went on record, stating that, any non-American design was "a waste of time" and refused point blank to accept any "foreign" design. It was learned that Studler had gone so far as to bury reports that suggested the .280 was superior in US testing.

A change of government meant that the 7 mm, EM-2 and Taden gun projects were abandoned soon afterwards by Winston Churchill, who returned as the prime minister and desired commonality between the NATO countries. Small amounts of .280 British ammunition were later produced during the 1960s for various small arms trials. At the same time, the British and Canadians, who were very impressed with the cartridge originally planned to have their FN FAL rifles chambered in .280. However, eventually, they agreed to a quid pro quo where the British would use the US-derived .30 (by now the 7.62) while the Americans accepted the FN FAL. This too proved not to be the case, and the US eventually chose their M14 rifle over the FAL.

After .280
The .280 British concept would later prove to have been far ahead of its time, as the U.S. itself adopted an intermediate cartridge — 5.56×45mm NATO — by the end of the following decade. Soon after America's large-scale involvement in Vietnam commenced in 1965 the 5.56×45mm NATO ArmaLite AR-15 rifle, later standardised as the M16, was purchased in ever increasing numbers and by the late 1960s had displaced the 7.62×51mm NATO M14 rifle in combat units. After insisting on a .30 calibre round with full-power ballistics almost identical to those of the existing .30-06 Springfield, the U.S. then adopted the 5.56×45mm NATO intermediate cartridge, which demonstrated the emergence and dominance of intermediate cartridges on the battlefield (the other notable one being the 7.62×39mm AK-47 round). The adoption of the 7.62×51mm NATO round and the adaptation of the intermediate cartridge CETME (later developed into the Heckler & Koch G3) and FN FAL designs to fire it, produced rifles that were relatively longer and heavier and had greater recoil. The result was weapons that performed well as longer-range semi-automatic rifles, but were more cumbersome and only marginally controllable in automatic fire. These guns also had a higher training burden and were not well suited to soldiers of smaller stature, again due to the recoil.  Coincidentally, in 2002 the Americans developed a military calibre intended for the M4 version of the M16 family called the 6.8mm Remington SPC — with similar ballistic properties to the .280 British cartridge — which was intended to provide better ballistics than the 5.56×45mm NATO.

In the late 1960s, a version of the .280 British was created using a 6.25 mm bullet in a necked-down .280 British case. It was designed in response to experiments in the U.K. trying to find an ideal military small-arms round. Large caliber bullets were calculated to need more energy to penetrate various levels of body armor to inflict disabling wounds on soldiers. Out of several "optimum solutions" ranging from 4.5 mm to 7 mm, the 6.25 mm was the preferred solution. While the 7.62×51mm NATO required  of force on impact to penetrate helmets and heavy body armor, the 6.25 mm required only  of impact force to deliver the same penetration effects out to 600 m. It remained effective for a longer distance and produced recoil closer to that of the 5.56×45mm NATO. However, it was not designed for very long range and its bullet was relatively light. Testing of the 6.25×43mm was conducted from 1969 to 1971, when development ceased in favor of the smaller 4.85×49mm.

In April 2022 in recognition of the decreased effectiveness of the NATO 5.56mm round particularly against personnel in body armour the American Army let a ten year contract to Sig Sauer for production of the XM5 rifle, XM250 Automatic rifle and 6.8mm (.277”) cartridge.

Specifications

Types of bullets and colours of tips:
AP
API:  black
Ball: plain (unmarked), green, pink, yellow, brown
Observation ( WP): red
Tracer: white

Note: Most cartridges have been observed with a purple annulus. Several experimental cartridge cases were made out of aluminium, in various colors including orange.

Known manufacturers:
Radway Green
Fabrique Nationale
Kynoch

Performance
The following comparisons  are excerpts from a manual published by the "Small Arms Group Armament Design Establishment" from the Ministry of Supply:

Variants
.270 British: Designed at the same time as the .280 British . Research was abandoned in 1948. 
7 mm "Compromise" (aka T65/7 mm): Necked down T65 (7.62×51mm NATO) to 7 mm.
7 mm "Second Optimum" (7×49 mm): Designed by FN. Also known as the 7 mm "Medium" and the 7 mm "Liviano". FN would later sell FAL rifles chambered in this calibre along with a sizeable amount of ammunition to Venezuela.
6.25 mm (6.25×43 mm): A British experimental cartridge designed during the early 1970s, using the .280/30 as a parent case, which was necked down to fit a smaller bullet.

Comparable cartridges

For .280 British:
 7×44mm Danish, a Danish experimental cartridge fired by the Weibel M/1932 tested in 1936. 
 7mm BR Remington, a wildcat cartridge, at one time produced by Remington Arms)
 .308×1.5-inch Barnes and its necked-down 7 mm variant

For 7 mm HV, 7 mm Compromise, 7 mm Second Optimum:
 7mm-08 Remington

See also
EM-2 rifle
BSA 28P rifle
Taden gun
7 mm caliber - other 7 mm cartridges
Table of handgun and rifle cartridges

References

External links

7.62 NATO Contemporaries
.280/ 7×43 mm Dimensions (Spanish) 
BSA 28P rifle
A Comparison of United Kingdom and United States Ammunition for Lightweight Weapoens, Ninth Report of Project TS2-2015, Volume I, 5 June 1950, Development and Proof Services, Aberdeen Proving Grounds Maryland 
 A Cartridge in Brief: .280 British, Jack Dutschke, ARES, 6 June 2018

Pistol and rifle cartridges
Experimental cartridges
British firearm cartridges